Muzsikás is a Hungarian musical group playing mainly folk music of Hungary and other countries and peoples of the region. Established in 1973, it has also played works by classical composers, especially Béla Bartók, who himself collected folk tunes. The group has recorded other albums and, since 1978, has toured regularly around the world.

The group's collaboration with the noted singer Márta Sebestyén has produced a string of highly regarded recordings. The traditional Hungarian folk song, "Szerelem, Szerelem", performed by Muzsikas featuring Márta Sebestyén, featured in the movie The English Patient (1996). Three of their songs are used in the anime film Only Yesterday by Studio Ghibli: "Teremtés" ("Creation"), "Hajnali nóta" ("Morning Song"), and "Fuvom az énekem" ("I Sing My Song"). The name of the group is mentioned by the main protagonists, while the songs play in the background in a prolonged dialogue about the benefits of a natural environment and rural life.

Members
The group's core members are:
Mihály Sipos - violin, citera
László Porteleki - violin, koboz, vocal
Péter Éri - kontra, viola, mandolin, flute, long flute
Dániel Hamar - contrabass, gardon, drum, cymbal

Permanent guests are:
Márta Sebestyén - vocal, flute, tilinko
Zoltán Farkas – choreography, dance, percussion
Ildikó Tóth - choreography, dance

The group also plays regularly with a range of other musicians and groups.

Discography
Albums
Living Hungarian Folk Music I. MUZSIKÁS (Hungaroton Gong)
Márta Sebestyén and Muzsikás (Hannibal/Ryko), 1987
The Prisoner's Song (Hannibal/Ryko), 1991
Blues for Transylvania (Hannibal/Ryko), 1991
Maramaros, the Lost Jewish Music (Hannibal/Ryko), 1993
Muzsikás Kettő (Munich Records), 1995
It is not like it used to be (Hungaroton Gong), 2001
Morning Star (Hannibal/Ryko), 2003
The Bartók Album (Hannibal/Ryko), 2004
Live at the Liszt Academy (Muzsikás)

Compilations
Fly Bird, Fly - The very best of Muzsikás (Demon Music Group Ltd), 2011

Contributing artist
The Rough Guide to World Music (World Music Network, 1994)

References

External links
Muzsikás official website
interview with Dániel Hamar of Muzsikás

Hungarian folk music groups
Musical groups established in 1973